This articles details notable events occurring in Japanese football in 1962. In 1962, the Japan national football team went 1-2-4 in international play, with its only win coming against the Thailand national football team. That year, Chuo University won the Emperor's Cup.

Emperor's Cup

National team

Results

Players statistics

External links

 
Seasons in Japanese football